Tigeraksa is a district located in the Tangerang Regency of Banten in Tanah Pasundan, Indonesia. It covers 48.74 km2 and had 119,245 inhabitants in 2010 and 155,557 inhabitants in 2020. The administrative headquarters of the Regency are located here.

Climate
Tigaraksa has a tropical rainforest climate (Af) with moderate rainfall from June to September and heavy rainfall from October to May.

References

Tangerang Regency
Districts of Banten
Regency seats of Banten
Populated places in Banten